N-Vinylcarbazole is an organic compound used as a monomer in the production of poly(vinylcarbazole), a conductive polymer, in which conductivity is photon-dependent.  The compound is used in the photoreceptors of photocopiers. Upon exposure to γ-irradiation, N-vinylcarbazole undergoes solid-state polymerisation.

It is produced by the vinylation of carbazole with acetylene in the presence of base.

Related compounds
Carbazole

References

Carbazoles
Monomers
Vinyl compounds